Albin Dunajewski (born 1 March 1817 in Stanisławów - 19 June 1894 in Kraków) was a Bishop of Kraków, Poland, as well as charitable patron and high-profile social activist.

Highlights
In 1882, Albin Dunajewski ordained Brother Raphael Kalinowski as Priest of the Discalced Carmelite Order.  Father Raphael was canonized in 1991, by Pope John Paul II. In 1892, Cardinal Dunajewski (elevated to that rank in 1890) laid the corner-stone for the construction of the Church of the Holy Virgin Mary of Lourdes founded by the Lazarists in the district of Krowodrza, but died two years later, just before its consecration in 1894.

See also
 Archbishop of Kraków (with complete list)

Notes and references

1817 births
1894 deaths
Religious leaders from Ivano-Frankivsk
People from the Kingdom of Galicia and Lodomeria
Members of the House of Lords (Austria)
19th-century Polish cardinals
Bishops of Kraków
Discalced Carmelite bishops
Cardinals created by Pope Leo XIII
Burials at Wawel Cathedral